Aleksandr Yevgenyevich Soldatenkov (born 28 December 1996) is a Russian football player. He plays as a centre back for PFC Krylia Sovetov Samara.

Club career
He made his professional debut in the Russian Professional Football League for FC Chertanovo Moscow on 14 July 2014 in a game against FC Metallurg Lipetsk. He made his Russian Football National League debut for Chertanovo on 17 July 2018 in a game against FC Rotor Volgograd.

He made his Russian Premier League debut for PFC Krylia Sovetov Samara on 25 July 2021 in a game against FC Akhmat Grozny.

International career
Soldatenkov was called up to the Russia national football team for the first time in November 2022 for friendly games against Tajikistan and Uzbekistan. He made his debut against Tajikistan on 17 November 2022.

Career statistics

Club

International

References

External links
 
 
 

1996 births
Footballers from Moscow
Living people
Russian footballers
Russia international footballers
Association football defenders
FC Chertanovo Moscow players
PFC Krylia Sovetov Samara players
Russian Premier League players
Russian First League players
Russian Second League players